South Vietnam was in political chaos during much of the year, as generals competed for power and Buddhists protested against the government.  The Viet Cong (VC) communist guerrillas expanded their operations and defeated the South Vietnamese Army of the Republic of Vietnam (ARVN) in many battles. North Vietnam made a definitive judgement in January to assist the VC insurgency with men and material.  In November, North Vietnam ordered the People's Army of Vietnam (PAVN) to infiltrate units into South Vietnam and undertake joint military operations with the VC.

The new President of the United States, Lyndon Johnson, and his civilian and military advisers wrestled with the problem of a failing government in South Vietnam and military gains by the VC. In August, an attack on United States Navy vessels caused Johnson to seek and gain U.S. congressional approval of the Tonkin Gulf Resolution, which authorized him to use military force if necessary to defend South Vietnam. Throughout the year, there were calls from many quarters—American, foreign, and South Vietnamese—for the United States to negotiate an agreement for the neutralization of South Vietnam, which they refused to consider.

Many of President Johnson's advisers advocated an air war against North Vietnam and the introduction of U.S. combat troops into South Vietnam. By year's end, the 23,000 U.S. military personnel in South Vietnam were still technically "advisers" (although they participated in many air and ground operations with the ARVN), but Johnson was contemplating U.S. ground troops.

January

2 January
United States Marine Corps (USMC) Major General Victor H. Krulak, along with a committee of experts asked to advise on the war, submitted a recommendation to President Johnson for a three phase series of covert actions against North Vietnam. Phase I, for February to May, called for propaganda dissemination and "20 destructive undertakings ... designed to result in substantial destruction, economic loss and harassment", and a second and third phase of increasing magnitude.

The ARVN captured a large arms cache in the Mekong Delta, including weapons manufactured in China. United States Secretary of State Dean Rusk said this proved that North Vietnam was supplying the VC.

 10 January
United States Ambassador to South Vietnam Henry Cabot Lodge Jr. reported to Washington that the new President of South Vietnam Dương Văn Minh told him that he opposed American soldiers going into villages and districts of rural Vietnam as they would be perceived as "more imperialistic than the French" and would give credence to communist propaganda that the Saigon government was a lackey of the United States.

 14 January
Theodore Sorensen, one of former President John F. Kennedy's most trusted aides, wrote President Johnson to oppose the neutralization of South Vietnam as proposed by French President Charles de Gaulle and others. Sorensoen said neutralization would result in a communist takeover of South Vietnam, weaken the U.S. position in Asia, and cause political problems for the Democratic Party. Johnson's principal advisers—Dean Rusk, Robert McNamara, McGeorge Bundy and Walter Rostow—echoed Sorensen's views. In December, Senator Mike Mansfield had proposed negotiation of a neutral South Vietnam.

Lieutenant general William C. Westmoreland is appointed deputy commander of MACV.

 20 January
The Central Committee of the Communist Party of Vietnam adopted Resolution 9. The secret resolution declared all-out war on South Vietnam to defeat the ARVN before the United States could introduce a large number of American soldiers into the war. The Resolution estimated that American soldiers participating in the war would not exceed 100,000. The Americans "clearly understand that if they get bogged down in a large-scale protracted war, then they will fall into an extremely defensive position internationally." Diplomacy would be expanded to gain "the sympathy of antiwar groups in the United States" and other people around the world. Finally, the Resolution called for a purge of party members in North Vietnam who had emphasized socialistic development in North Vietnam rather than North Vietnamese help for the "liberation" of the South.

Resolution 9 was the most important Communist party decision on action in South Vietnam since the Geneva Accords of 1954, which had provisionally separated North and South Vietnam pending national elections (never held, due to opposition by the government of South Vietnam).

With the adoption of Resolution 9, party moderates such as Ho Chi Minh and Võ Nguyên Giáp were marginalized and those who supported the Soviet policy of peaceful coexistence were purged in what became known as the "Revisionist Anti-Party Affair." Militant leaders such as Lê Duẩn and Lê Đức Thọ who favored the Chinese Maoist approach of worldwide revolution took command of the Communist Party and North Vietnam.

22 January
The U.S. Joint Chiefs of Staff sent a classified memorandum to U.S. Secretary of Defense McNamara, urging an expansion of U.S. involvement in the war, advocating heavy bombing of North Vietnam, and deployment of troops in South Vietnam for an eventual invasion of the North.

24 January
Military Assistance Command, Vietnam – Studies and Observations Group (MACV-SOG) was established to conduct covert unconventional warfare operations in Vietnam.

 30 January

General Nguyễn Khánh led a successful coup ousting the military junta led by General Dương Văn Minh from the leadership of South Vietnam. It came less than three months after Minh's junta had come to power in a coup d'état which overthrew and killed then President Ngô Đình Diệm. The only casualty of the coup was the execution of Minh's aide, Major Nguyen Van Nhung, and lasted only a few hours. Khánh would allow Minh to resume the office of President nine days later and place himself in the role of prime minister. Minh's colleagues, Generals Tran Van Don, Le Van Kim and Ton That Dinh were placed under house arrest, accused of planning a neutralist takeover of South Vietnam.

 31 January
Journalist James Reston in The New York Times called for the U.S. to seek a negotiated settlement to the war in South Vietnam. Reston's view echoed that of French President de Gaulle who was advocating that negotiations begin to make South Vietnam a neutral country

February
 1 February
United States Senate Majority Leader Mike Mansfield told President Johnson that the overthrow of the Minh government was unlikely to result in "significant improvement in the situation" in South Vietnam. Mansfield said the coup was "likely to be only the second in a series as military leaders, released from all civilian restraint, jockey for control of the power which resides in United States aid."

 3 February
The new leader of South Vietnam, General Khánh, reversed an earlier decision by Minh by giving his approval to the assignment of additional American military and civilian advisers and authorizing U.S.-directed covert operations in North Vietnam under Operation 34A (OPLAN 34A).

The North Vietnamese Vietnam People's Air Force (VPAF) established its first jet fighter unit, the 921st Sao Dao Fighter Regiment. A few weeks later, the first VPAF jet pilots began their training in the Soviet Union.

4 February
The VC overran an ARVN battalion headquarters at Hau May killing 12 ARVN.

9 February
A VC bombing attack on a softball game at Pershing Field killed two Americans and wounded 41, including four women and five children. A second bomb failed to explode.

16 February
The VPAF scored its first aerial victory against an American aircraft when a T-28 Trojan, whose pilot had defected to North Vietnam from the Royal Lao Air Force, shot down a C-123 Provider transport.

A bomb in the Kinh Do movie theater on 16 April killed three Americans with a further 32 wounded, most of them U.S. dependents.

 17 February
David Nes, the Deputy Chief of Mission of the U.S. Embassy in Saigon, wrote a pessimistic memorandum to Ambassador Lodge and senior officials in Washington. Nes did not see much prospect for the improvement of South Vietnamese performance. He said that escalation of the U.S. military effort might be the only alternative to the neutralization of South Vietnam as proposed by de Gaulle and others.

25 February
The VC bombed a train travelling from Saigon to Da Nang killing 11.

 26 February
In the Battle of Long Dinh the ARVN, despite overwhelming numbers and firepower, was not aggressive in its attack and the VC 514th Battalion escaped. The battle resulted in 40 VC and 16 ARVN killed.

March
 4 March
President Johnson met with the Joint Chiefs of Staff. The Chairman of the Joint Chiefs of Staff General Maxwell Taylor recommended a "progressive and selective attack on targets in North Vietnam." Johnson, however, disagreed, saying that "he did not want to start a war before November" because of the impact an expanded war might have on the Presidential elections that month.

14 March
The ARVN captured more than 500 suspected VC in a raid in Kien Phong Province.

15 March
In what one historian would describe as "the earliest expression" of "antiwar feeling among American college students" in response to the war, students at Yale University concluded a three-day long conference on socialism that included members of the new Students for a Democratic Society and launched the "May 2nd Movement" (M2M), and adjourned with plans for an antiwar demonstration in New York City for May 2, 1964.

 16 March
Secretary of Defense McNamara wrote a memo to President Johnson after returning from his most recent visit to South Vietnam. McNamara said that up to 40 percent of South Vietnam was now controlled by the VC, the Khánh government was ineffective, the South Vietnamese apathetic and the Americans in South Vietnam frustrated. He recommended that the U.S. finance a 50,000 man increase in the size of the ARVN. He also recommended that the United States Air Force (USAF) be prepared to initiate bombing of North Vietnam. Johnson approved the plan and directed its implementation.

17 March
What would become known as the "domino theory" became the basis for American policy on Vietnam, after President Johnson approved National Security Action Memorandum 288 and the recommendations made to him by Secretary of Defense McNamara. "We seek an independent non-Communist South Vietnam," McNamara wrote, adding that "unless we can achieve this objective ... almost all of Southeast Asia will probably fall under Communist dominance", starting with South Vietnam, Laos, and Cambodia, followed by Burma and Malaysia. "Thailand might hold for a period with our help, but would be under grave pressure. Even the Philippines would become shaky and the threat to India to the west, Australia and New Zealand to the south and Taiwan, Korea, and Japan to the north and east would be greatly increased."

19 March
ARVN troops accompanied by U.S. Army advisers, mistakenly crossed the border into Cambodia and attacked the village of Chanthrea, killing 17 civilians.

 26 March
Senator Wayne Morse was the only prominent American politician to publicly oppose American military involvement in South Vietnam. Morse strongly disagreed with McNamara's assessment of the situation in Vietnam. To refute McNamara's contention that the U.S. was fighting communism in South Vietnam, Morse said, "There are no Chinese soldiers in South Vietnam. There are no Russian soldiers in South Vietnam. The only foreign soldiers in South Vietnam are U.S. soldiers."

U.S. Army Captain Floyd James Thompson was captured by the VC after he and his pilot, Richard L. Whitesides flying in an O-1 Bird Dog, were shot down over Quảng Trị Province. Whitesides was killed in the crash, while Thompson was sent to a prison camp in North Vietnam. Released on 16 March 1973, Thompson remains the longest serving American prisoner of war.

April
 4 April
Former Vice President Richard Nixon said that President Johnson's plans to defeat the communists in South Vietnam "may be inadequate." He said that a visit to South Vietnam had persuaded him that "Johnson's Vietnam policy would not succeed."

8 April

9 April
The ARVN captured a VC base on the Laotian border killing 75 VC.

12–20 April
In the Battle of Kien Long the VC captured Kiên Long district in Chương Thiện Province and were later evicted by the ARVN with U.S. air support. The battle resulted in 175 VC killed and 55 ARVN killed and 17 missing.

 19 April
At a meeting in Saigon, U.S. Ambassador Lodge proposed that the U.S. send a neutral interlocutor to Hanoi to present an ultimatum to North Vietnam to "call off" the VC. Canadian diplomat J. Blair Seaborn was later selected to undertake the mission after consultations between Canada and the United States.

In Laos, the coalition government of Prince Souvanna Phouma was deposed by a right-wing military group, led by Brigadier General Kouprasith Abhay. Souvanna and other cabinet members were placed under house arrest and the Geneva Accords that had kept an uneasy peace with the left-wing Pathet Lao were on the verge of collapsing while U.S. Ambassador to Laos Leonard S. Unger was out of town. Unger rushed back to the Laotian capital of Vientiane and rushed to Souvanna's residence where, as one historian would later note, a "'Romeo and Juliet' scene took place, as Souvanna Phouma stood at a balcony on the second floor and expressed his desire to discontinue premiership, while Ambassador Unger stood on the ground begging him to continue to head the government." Assured of U.S. support for his government, Souvanna resumed his duties as Prime Minister and would remain Prime Minister in office until 1975.

 27 April
Operation Quyet Thang 202, an ARVN operation carried out with US support, began.  The one-month-long operation claimed heavy damage to the Do Xa sanctuary which linked the VC's supply lines between Laos and Vietnam's Central Highlands.

 30 April
Former President Kennedy's brother, Robert F. Kennedy, said in an oral interview for the Kennedy Library that President Kennedy had "a strong, overwhelming reason for being in Vietnam and that we should win the war in Vietnam."  Kennedy denied that any consideration had been given by the President to withdrawing from Vietnam.  He equivocated on the introduction of U.S. ground troops into Vietnam, saying that "we'd face that when we came to it."

May
 2 May
VC commandos eluded detection and placed an explosive on the USNS Card. The ship, moored in the Saigon River, sunk and five American sailors were killed. The USNS Card was later raised and repaired.

About 1,000 students participated in the first major student demonstration against the Vietnam War, marching in New York City as part of the "May 2nd Movement" that had been organized by students at Yale University. Marches also occurred in San Francisco, Boston, Seattle, and Madison, Wisconsin.

 5 May
A U.S. Army CV-2 Caribou crashed shortly after takeoff from Tân Hiệp killing all 15 onboard including ten Americans.

8–9 May
Cambodian forces destroy an ARVN armored personnel carrier that crossed the border in pursuit of VC. The next day Cambodian and ARVN troops clash resulting in seven Cambodians killed.

 9 May
Former President Diem's brother, Ngo Dinh Can was executed by order of General Khanh. U.S. Ambassador Lodge asked that Can's life be spared, but Khanh chose to placate the militant Buddhist movement in South Vietnam. Earlier in the day, Phan Quang Dong, the former chief of Can's secret police force, was executed at the municipal stadium in Huế before a crowd of 40,000 people.

A plot to assassinate Secretary of Defense McNamara was foiled, three days before his visit to South Vietnam, with the arrest of VC agent Nguyễn Văn Trỗi. Trỗi had planned to detonate a bomb as McNamara was being driven across the Cong Ly Bridge in Saigon on 12 May.

 12 May
American Ambassador Lodge said in a secret meeting that Buddhist leader Thich Tri Quang is "ambitious, anti-Christian, full of hatreds, and agitating against [the government of] Khanh. He said that "some communist infiltration of Buddhists exists."

14 May

16 May
Twelve men in New York City publicly burned their draft cards to protest against the war. The demonstration, with about 50 people in Union Square, was organized by the War Resisters League.

19 May
The U.S. began "Operation Yankee Team", low-level and medium-level reconnaissance flights from South Vietnam over PAVN/VC strongholds in neighboring Laos, at the request of the Royal Laotian Armed Forces. Two days after flights began over southern Laos in the area that was part of the Ho Chi Minh Trail, U.S. Navy planes would conduct sorties over northern Laos.

20 May to mid-September
The USMC Signal Engineering Survey Unit, a radio detachment consisting of three officers and 27 enlisted men drawn from the 1st Radio Company, Fleet Marine Force, Pacific and from Headquarters Marine Corps supported by a 76-man infantry detachment from Company G, 2nd Battalion, 3rd Marines, commanded by  Major Alfred M. Gray, Jr. deployed to Danang Air Base. The unit established communication facilities at Khe Sanh, Tiger Tooth Mountain (Dong Voi Mẹp), Monkey Mountain and Bạch Mã. The unit left South Vietnam in mid-September.

21 May

Pathet Lao antiaircraft artillery damaged a U.S. Navy RF-8A Crusader that was flying a photographic reconnaissance mission.

 23 May
Western sources estimated the PAVN to number 16 divisions totaling 280,000 men, plus militias with 180,000 men, and a border force of 20,000 men. A reserve militia force numbered 400,000. North Vietnam had not yet infiltrated any elements of the PAVN into South Vietnam.

 24 May
Senator Barry Goldwater, who would become the Republican Party candidate for President of the United States later in 1964, discussed the use of nuclear bombs against North Vietnam to interrupt supply lines for the VC in South Vietnam. In the face of widespread criticism of his remarks, Goldwater said he was only "repeating a suggestion made by competent military people." Democrats used Goldwater's statements about the use of nuclear weapons to portray him as an extremist in the election campaign.

 27 May
President Johnson revealed the depth of his uncertainty about South Vietnam in a conversation with Senator Richard Russell. Johnson said his advisers were telling him to "show some power and some force", but he didn't believe the American people were behind the war. Russell agreed and expressed doubt that bombing North Vietnam would win the war. Johnson said he didn't know how to get out of the Vietnam War, adding that he would be impeached if he were to withdraw from the war. "I don't know how in the hell you're gonna get out unless they [the Senate Republicans] tell you to get out." After the talk with Russell, Johnson telephoned his adviser McGeorge Bundy and said, "I don't think it [South Vietnam] is worth fighting for and I don't think we can get out.  It's just the biggest damn mess I ever saw."

 28 May
Khánh presided over a trial of the generals he toppled and accused of neutralism, in light of US pressure on him to give his opponents a hearing. Minh was accused of misusing a small amount of money, before being allowed to serve as an advisor on the trial panel. Generals Don, Kim and Dinh were secretly interrogated, mostly about details of their coup against Diệm, rather than the original charge of promoting neutralism. When the court reconvened for the verdict on 29 May, Khánh stated, "We ask that once you begin to serve again in the army, you do not take revenge on anybody". The tribunal then "congratulated" the generals, but found that they were of "lax morality" and unqualified to command due to a "lack of a clear political concept". They were chastised for being "inadequately aware of their heavy responsibility" and of letting "their subordinates take advantage of their positions". The four imprisoned generals were allowed to remain in Da Lat under surveillance with their families. However, there were reports that the trial ended in a festive manner akin to a party, as the officers shook hands and made up with one another. All four generals were barred from commanding troops for a period; Kim was banned for six years, and Đôn 18 months. Offices were prepared for the quartet so that they could participate in "research and planning". When Khánh was himself deposed in 1965, he handed over dossiers proving that the four generals were innocent; the original documents that Khánh claimed proved his accusations of neutralism were neither presented to nor found by anyone.

June
1–2 June
Senior U.S. military and Administration officials conducted a strategy conference at CINCPAC in Hawaii in which they discuss bombing North Vietnam.

2 June
President Johnson called a White House press conference without advance notice and told reporters that the United States was "bound by solemn commitments" to defend South Vietnam against Communist encroachment, and cited a 25 October 1954 letter from U.S. President Dwight D. Eisenhower to South Vietnamese President Ngo Dinh Diem pledging an American promise to protect the Vietnamese government.

 4 June
United Nations Security Council Resolution 189, adopted unanimously, deplored an incident caused by the penetration of military units of South Vietnam into Cambodia and requested compensation for the Cambodians. The resolution also requested that all States and authorities recognize and respect Cambodia's neutrality and territorial integrity, and sent representatives from Brazil, Ivory Coast and Morocco to the sites of the most recent incidents and to report back to the council in 45 days with recommendations.

5 June
Ambassador Lodge sent a cable to President Johnson recommending that the United States not send more ground troops into South Vietnam to fight the VC. Such a step, he cautioned, would be a "venture of unlimited possibilities which could put us onto a slope along which we slide into a bottomless pit."

6–7 June
The Pathet Lao shot down a U.S. Navy RF-8A Crusader reconnaissance jet over Laos. President Johnson authorized an air strike against a Pathet Lao anti-aircraft battery. The RF-8A pilot, Lieutenant Charles Klusmann was captured by the Pathet Lao and escaped from captivity three months later.

 8 June
Australia's Minister for Defence announced that the Australian Army Training Team Vietnam would be increased to 83 advisers and their role expanded.

 18 June
Canadian diplomat Blair Seaborn met with North Vietnamese prime minister Phạm Văn Đồng to deliver a U.S. message. The U.S., he said, would choose escalation of the conflict rather than withdrawal and considered the war to be a confrontation with communism and thus of international importance. Đồng responded that any peaceful settlement in South Vietnam had to result in the withdrawal of the United States, the neutralization of South Vietnam and the eventual reunification of South and North Vietnam. Seaborn's conclusion was that North Vietnam's leaders were "completely convinced that military action at any level is not, repeat not, going to bring success for the US and government forces in South Vietnam." The North Vietnamese emphasized their "quiet determination to go on struggling as long as necessary to achieve objectives which they said they were bound to achieve in the long run."

The New York Times published the remarks of a U.S. military adviser in South Vietnam, later identified as Colonel Wilbur Wilson. Wilson said that the VC were stronger and better armed than they had been three years earlier and that more than 90 percent of their weapons were of U.S. origin, captured from the ARVN. Wilson advocated a massive increase in the U.S. military commitment to South Vietnam.

 20 June

General William Westmoreland replaced General Paul D. Harkins as the commander of the Military Assistance Command Vietnam (MACV) General Maxwell Taylor engineered the appointment of Westmoreland, over the objections of some of his military colleagues.

26 June
The ARVN attacked a VC training camp in Quảng Ngãi Province killing over 50 recruits.

An ARVN armored force attacked a VC force at Bau Cot killing over 100 VC.

27 June
ARVN Rangers attacked a VC force at Long Hoi south of Saigon killing at least 43 VC from the Cuu Long Battalion. Two Americans and one South Vietnamese were killed when their helicopter was shot down and a T-28 was also shot down by the VC.

28 June
French Foreign Minister Maurice Couve de Murville speaking from a studio in Paris to the New York moderators on the NBC show Meet the Press, cautioned that United States could not win the war if it increased its involvement. "This is not an ordinary war," he said. "That means a war you can just settle by victory or defeat. It is not that simple ... the problem cannot be settled by military means but should be settled by political means."

 29 June
The Republican members of the United States House of Representatives, released a statement saying, "A victory in South Vietnam over the military and subversive threats of Communism is urgently required."  Republican Congressman Gerald Ford said that the U.S. should "take command of the forces in Vietnam and not simply remain advisers."

New Zealand began its first military involvement in the war when a 25-man New Zealand Army engineering detachment arrived at Tan Son Nhut Air Base. The detachment would be based at Thủ Dầu Một, the capital of Bình Dương Province alongside a U.S. advisory team.

July

 1 July
General Maxwell Taylor was appointed as the U.S. Ambassador to South Vietnam, replacing Henry Cabot Lodge Jr.

2 July
The VC ambushed an ARVN convoy on the Mang Yang Pass in Bình Định Province killing 29 ARVN, destroying nine trucks and capturing more than 30 weapons.

3 July
MACV sent a request to Admiral U. S. Grant Sharp Jr., Commander-in-Chief, Pacific for authorization of a patrol of the Gulf of Tonkin to get information about North Vietnam's coastal defense. Admiral Sharp would dispatch the destroyer  to the area.

4 July
The VC attacked Polei Krong Camp, in an action apparently timed to coincide with the American 4 July holiday, killing 41 Civilian Irregular Defense Group (CIDG) troops and seizing a mortar, four machine guns and more than 100 small arms.

5–6 July
The Battle of Nam Dong was fought when the VC attacked the Nam Dong CIDG camp in an attempt to overrun it. The VC lost 62 killed, the ARVN 57 killed, the U.S. two killed and Australian Warrant Officer Class Two Kevin Conway was killed, the first Australian battle casualty of the war.

 8 July
U Thant, Secretary General of the United Nations said at a press conference that "the only sensible solution" to the war in South Vietnam was to reconvene the Geneva Conference of 1954 to negotiate peace in Southeast Asia. The U.S. rejected his proposal. President Johnson later said, "We do not believe in conferences called to ratify terror."

The U.S. Department of Defense announced that American casualties in South Vietnam had risen to 1387 "since American forces became fully involved in the jungle war in 1961", a number broken down as "152 killed in action, 96 deaths not related to combat, 971 wounded in action, 151 non-battle injuries and 17 missing in action."

 11 July
The New York Times published a petition signed by more than 5,000 American academics urging that the U.S. government work toward the neutralization of South Vietnam. The spokesman for the group Hans J. Morgenthau said that escalation of the war was not the answer.

12 July
A large VC force attacked a South Vietnamese outpost in Chương Thiện Province and then ambushed the relief column with at least 18 ARVN killed and 19 missing. A subsequent ARVN operation in the area claimed to have killed 68 VC and captured 73 suspects for the loss of nine ARVN and two U.S.

13 July
More than 30 Rangers and three U.S. advisers were killed and 19 missing.

16 July
The ARVN killed over 100 VC in Vĩnh Bình Province for the loss of 17 killed.

19 July
At a rally in Saigon, Prime Minister Khánh called for expanding the war into North Vietnam. Before a crowd of 100,000 people, General Khanh led the rallying cry "Bac thien!" ("To the North!") and called on volunteers to not only defend South Vietnam, but to liberate North Vietnam.

20 July
The VC attack Cái Bè killing 11 Popular Force soldiers, ten women and 30 children.

22 July
The VC ambushed an ARVN battalion size convoy in Chương Thiện Province as they moved through an area of paddy fields and mangrove swamps from Vi Thanh to the district capital, Gò Quao. At least 26 ARVN were killed and up to 135 missing.

 23 July
In a speech in the Senate, Senator Frank Church said he could not understand how "25,000 hardcore Viet Cong" could "thwart the American-backed South Vietnamese government." The VC were being supplied by men with packs on their back traversing jungle trails, while the U.S. was sending shiploads of equipment and hundreds of millions of dollars to South Vietnam every year. Church also opposed widening the war by bombing North Vietnam. "Expanding the war is not getting out ... It is getting further in." This was Church's first public  declaration of concern about the trajectory of the war.

24–29 July
Operation Triangle was conducted by the Royal Lao Army and Forces Armées Neutralistes to capture the intersection of Routes 7 and 13, trap a Pathet Lao force and gain access to the Plain of Jars. The operation was a partial success with large amounts of material captured, but the Pathet Lao successfully evacuated and still controlled access to the Plain.

25 July
Hanoi Radio charged in a broadcast that U.S. Navy ships had fired upon North Vietnamese fishing craft, making the first assertion of United States aggression against North Vietnam.

27 July
The U.S. announces that a further 5,000 advisers will be sent to South Vietnam.

29 July
Cambodia accuses South Vietnam and the U.S. of using chemical weapons and killing 76 Cambodian villagers. The U.S. and South Vietnam deny the accusations.

 30 July
Prime Minister Khánh advocated an attack on North Vietnam by the U.S. and South Vietnam. The British Embassy in Saigon reported that if Khánh's demands for an attack were not met, he might resign the premiership or attempt to make a peace agreement with the VC. The Saigon Daily News said that, without an attack on the North, neutralism for South Vietnam would become a reality.

[[United States Nasty-class patrol boat|Nasty''' patrol boats]] of the Republic of Vietnam Navy moved into the Gulf of Tonkin on an Operation 34A mission, and attacked a North Vietnamese radar station on Hòn Mê island.

August
Former Vice President Nixon published an article in the Reader's Digest titled "Needed in Vietnam: The Will to Win."  Nixon accused the Johnson administration of compromise, weakness, and inconsistency.  He said that the U.S. should use its military power "to win this crucial war—and win it decisively." In public statements Nixon said that the U.S. should "take a tougher line toward Communism in Asia" and expand the war to North Vietnam and Laos.

 2 August

The first Gulf of Tonkin incident occurred in territorial waters off the coast of North Vietnam. The destroyer USS Maddox, performing a DESOTO patrol, was engaged by three Vietnam People's Navy P 4-class torpedo boats of the 135th Torpedo Squadron. In the ensuing sea battle, the Maddox expended over 280 3" and 5" shells, and four U.S. Navy F-8 Crusader jets strafed the North Vietnamese. There was damage to one US aircraft, one 14.5mm hit on the destroyer, 3 damaged torpedo boats, 4 North Vietnamese sailors killed and 6 wounded, with no US casualties. Although the U.S. claimed that the Maddox was engaged in peaceful surveillance, on nearby islands the Republic of Vietnam Navy were conducting Operation 34A guerrilla raids using Nasty-class patrol boats.

 4 August
U.S. destroyers USS Maddox and  reported that they were under fire, in a second Tonkin Gulf incident. Evidence suggests, however, that no actual attack took place. President Johnson informed Congressional leaders that he was ordering retaliatory air strikes on North Vietnam from U.S. aircraft carriers stationed off shore of Vietnam. Among the Congressional leaders, only Senator Mike Mansfield disagreed with the retaliation.

In Laos General Phoumi Nosavan ordered a Royal Lao Army Training Battalion commanded by his bodyguard Major Boua in an attempted coup in Vientiane. The coup was crushed by troops loyal to General Kouprasith Abhay.

 5 August
China ordered its military forces near the border with North Vietnam to be in a state of readiness and to "be ready to cope with any possible sudden attack" by the United States.

In retaliation for the Tonkin Gulf Incident, Operation Pierce Arrow consisted of 64 strike sorties of aircraft from the aircraft carriers  and  against the torpedo boat bases of Hon Gai, Loc Chao, Quảng Khê and Phuc Loi and the oil storage depot at Vinh. The U.S. lost two aircraft to anti-aircraft fire, Lieutenant Richard Sather was killed in his A-1 Skyraider while Lieutenant (junior grade) Everett Alvarez's A-4 Skyhawk was shot down and he became the first U.S. Navy Prisoner of War being held until 12 February 1973.

The Vietnam Era began for purposes of federal law pertaining to members of the United States Armed Forces, which defines the period of American involvement in the war as "the period beginning on August 5, 1964, and ending on March 27, 1973".

 6 August
The British Consul General in Hanoi cabled London that the only "plausible explanation" for the Tonkin Gulf incident "seems to be that it was a deliberate attempt by the Americans to provoke the North Vietnamese into hostile reaction."

China said about the Tonkin Gulf Incident that "Aggression by the United States against the Democratic Republic of Vietnam (North Vietnam) means aggression against China. China will not stand idly by without lending a helping hand." China immediately gave North Vietnam 51 MiG fighter planes, offered training to VPAF pilots, built airports in southern China to serve as sanctuaries for VPAF planes and provided weapons for the VC.

The VPAF 921st Sao Dao Squadron, arrived in North Vietnam after training at the Mengzi airfield, Yunnan province, China bringing 36 MiG-17 and MiG-19 fighters to Phúc Yên Air Base near Hanoi.

 7 August
Prime Minister Khánh declared a state of emergency and suspended the constitution in South Vietnam. This triggered large demonstrations by Buddhists and students in Saigon.

 10 August
The U.S. Congress voted on the Gulf of Tonkin Resolution authorizing the President "to take all necessary steps, including the use of armed force, to assist any member or protocol state of the Southeast Asia Collective Defense Treaty requesting assistance in defense of its freedom". The unanimous affirmative vote in the House of Representatives was 416–0. The Senate conferred its approval by a vote of 88–2. Some members expressed misgivings about the measure, but in the end, only Democratic Senators Wayne Morse of Oregon and Ernest Gruening of Alaska cast opposing votes.

China warned that it would "without hesitation ... resolutely support the Vietnamese people's just war against U.S. aggressors", though not committing to direct military intervention. American strategy during the war would be set when the Beijing government "informed Washington privately that it would not go beyond material aid provided that the United States did not invade North Vietnam with ground forces", which would be considered a threat to China's frontier.

 13 August
Chinese leader Mao Zedong told North Vietnamese leader Lê Duẩn that he did not believe that the American provocation in the Tonkin Gulf meant war and that none of the Americans, the North Vietnamese, nor the Chinese wanted war. Therefore, "because no one wants to fight a war, there will be no war."

Robert Thompson, counterinsurgency expert and head of the British Advisory Mission to South Vietnam, wrote to his government in London. "Defeat by the Viet Cong, through subversion and increased guerrilla activity is inevitable, and this prospect will become gradually more apparent over the next few months. The U.S., he said, should seek negotiations with North Vietnam or they "could be forced to insert combat troops in some strength."

 15 August
After a return visit to North Vietnam, Canadian diplomat J. Blair Seaborn reported to Ottawa and Washington. He offered American terms to North Vietnam's Prime Minister Phạm Văn Đồng: cease support for the VC and receive financial benefits from the United States; continue support and suffer the consequences. Đồng was furious. He said that the United States carried "the war to the North in order to find a way out of the impasse in the South" and added that "Johnson worries ... about the coming electoral battle in which it is necessary to outbid the Republican candidate." Đồng expressed support for negotiations in Geneva.

16 August
South Vietnam's Prime Minister Khánh, was named as the nation's new president, replacing figurehead chief of state Minh. Under a new constitution, drafted with the assistance of the U.S. Embassy, a 62-member revolutionary council had the right to veto Khánh's decisions.

20 August

The USAF began the first of 3,435 unmanned drone reconnaissance missions during the war, using the Ryan AQM-34 Lightning Bug series. The first of the Lightning Bugs flew a mission in Chinese airspace, while others flew over locations in Southeast Asia. The drones could gather photographic, electronic, and communication intelligence, as well as to serve as decoys or to drop leaflets.

 21 August
The VC inflicted more than 150 casualties on an ARVN unit in Kiến Hòa Province. Four American advisers were killed. General Westmoreland was dismayed because no local South Vietnamese had informed the ARVN that the VC were setting up the ambush.

U.S. Navy Lieutenant Charles F. Klusmann, who had been held captive by the Pathet Lao since 6 June, managed to escape his captors after he and five Laotian and Thai prisoners of war were able to tunnel under the wall of the compound and sneak past sentries. He and one of the five POWs were able to reach safety at Bouam Long. Klusmann would be one of only two U.S. Navy aviators to successfully escape captivity during the war.

21-25 August
Buddhists and students protest against the Khánh government.

25 August
A bomb exploded in Room 514 of the Caravelle Hotel, Saigon damaging nine rooms but causing no fatalities on a floor mainly occupied by foreign journalists.

25-29 August
Faced with large protests, General Khánh abruptly resigned as Prime Minister of South Vietnam on 25 August. He returned to power as part of a triumvirate with Duong Van Minh and Tran Thien Khiem on 27 August. With demonstrations against the Khánh government and the U.S. continuing, Buddhist leader Thich Tri Quang told U.S. Embassy officials in Saigon that "the Buddhists could not accept government by Christians" and that the Buddhists might withdraw  from the war, "leaving Catholics aided by Americans to fight the Communists." On 27 August ARVN troops opened fire on a crowd of 3,000 unarmed Roman Catholic demonstrators who were protesting outside of the national military headquarters. On 29 August Khánh fled Saigon to take refuge in Da Lat. In Saigon and other cities, street fighting among Roman Catholics, Buddhists, and students broke out. The VC applauded the struggle against the "confused puppet government" Nguyen Xuan Oanh was appointed as Prime Minister and charged with forming a caretaker government until domestic unrest and rioting could be brought under control.

 31 August
Ambassador Taylor journeyed to Dalat and persuaded Khánh to return to Saigon to resume leadership of the government. The CIA analyzed the situation.  "War weariness and a desire for a quick solution to the long struggle against the Viet Cong may be an important factor underlying the current agitation ... The confused situation is extremely vulnerable to exploitation by the Communists and by the proponents of a negotiated settlement." Khánh, however, was increasingly coming under the influence of militant Buddhists, led by Thích Trí Quang, who opposed foreign influences such as the United States and Catholicism.

September
 4 September
Assistant Secretary of Defense John McNaughton recommended to his superior, Robert McNamara, that, given the chaotic state of South Vietnam, the U.S. consider sending a significant number of combat troops to South Vietnam and provoke actions to justify an air war against North Vietnam. Other advisers of President Johnson were making similar proposals.

5 September
The ARVN reported killing 79 VC in an operation in Quảng Ngãi Province, with eight ARVN killed.

 6 September
Ambassador Taylor in Saigon reported to the Department of State in Washington that in South Vietnam only "the emergence of an exceptional leader could improve the situation." He proposed that the U.S. assume "increased responsibility" for the outcome of the war because "The consequences of this defeat in the rest of Asia, Africa, and Latin America would be disastrous."

8 September
A triumvirate of generals to lead South Vietnam until a civilian government could be permitted, was installed by the Military Revolutionary Council (MRC) under American pressure. The council was headed by Duong Van Minh and included Nguyen Khanh and Tran Thien Khiem.

9 September
President Johnson held his first meeting since the Gulf of Tonkin incident with his Ambassador Taylor and with national security advisers and raised the question of "whether anyone doubted Vietnam was worth the effort" of going to war; at the time, everyone present agreed that it was necessary to fight in order to protect the credibility of the United States worldwide. According to notes taken of the meeting, Taylor said that the U.S. "could not afford to let Hanoi win, in terms of our overall position in the area and in the world". General Earle Wheeler, the new Chairman of the Joint Chiefs of Staff, said that the joint chiefs agreed "that if we should lose in South Vietnam, we would lose Southeast Asia", after which "country after country on the periphery would give way and look toward Communist China as the rising power of the area.".

 10 September
President Johnson approved National Security Action Memorandum 314 which authorized the resumption of naval patrols in the Tonkin Gulf and clandestine operations against North Vietnam under Operation 34A, limited actions in Laos, retaliatory actions if U.S. personnel were attacked, and continued economic aid to South Vietnam.

 13 September
Prompted by Prime Minister Khánh's concessions to the Buddhists, Generals Dương Văn Đức and Lam Van Phat attempted a coup d'état. Air Force Commander Nguyễn Cao Kỳ and Generals Nguyen Chanh Thi and Nguyễn Văn Thiệu helped Khánh put down the coup. These three officers were the most prominent of the Young Turks, who gained increasing power in Saigon junta politics.

 15 September
UN Secretary General U Thant secured agreement from North Vietnam to engage in exploratory talks with the United States.  He passed that information to the U.S.'s UN Ambassador Adlai Stevenson who was "favorably surprised" and conveyed the news to Secretary of State Rusk.  The U.S. did not respond to U Thant's invitation for talks and Stevenson was later told that President Johnson was too busy with the election to respond. It is unclear whether Thant's invitation for talks was ever shared with Johnson.

18 September
The  and the  detected radar signals and concluded that an attack from North Vietnamese patrol boats was imminent.  The destroyers fired multiple shells, but, as with the Turner Joy incident, were ultimately unable to locate any enemy vessels.

 19 September
A Montagnard revolt broke out in South Vietnam, near the Central Highland city of Ban Me Thuot. U.S. Special Forces soldiers had been training Montagnard soldiers under the CIDG program. The Montagnards and United Front for the Liberation of Oppressed Races (FULRO) activists launched attacks against South Vietnamese Special Forces soldiers and militiamen, killing several dozen and capturing hundreds. About 2,000 Montagnards faced off against an ARVN division. Several U.S soldiers were taken hostage, while other U.S. Special Forces personnel served as intermediaries between the ARVN and the Montagnards.

25 September
President Johnson said "There are those that say you ought to go north and drop bombs, to try to wipe out the supply lines, and they think that would escalate the war. We don't want our American boys to do the fighting for Asian boys."

 26 September
Khánh and the senior officers in his military junta created a semblance of civilian rule by forming the High National Council (HNC), an appointed advisory body akin to a legislature. This came after lobbying by American officials, led by Ambassador Maxwell Taylor, as they placed great value in the appearance of civilian legitimacy, which they saw as vital to building a popular base for any government.

 27 September
The High National Council elected Phan Khắc Sửu as its Chairman and Tran Van Huong as Prime Minister. The job of the council was to draft a new constitution. The U.S. had urged the creation of the council to reduce the visibility of the South Vietnamese military in the government. Prime Minister Huong repressed Buddhist demonstrations in the months ahead.

U.S. Army troops rescued 60 South Vietnamese hostages and seized the main camp of the Montagnard rebels operating at Buon Sar Pa near South Vietnam's frontier with Cambodia. The Americans flew in on 50 helicopters from the Ban Me Thuot East Airfield and picked up the hostages, then aided in placing the 470 rebels on a convoy of trucks.

 28 September
After negotiations, the last of the Montagnards in revolt released their prisoners.  U.S. Special Forces remained with the Montagnards to maintain calm. The South Vietnamese government agreed to meet with the Montagnards to discuss their grievances. A few days later, a Montagnard congress demanded more autonomy for the Montagnards, including a 50,000 man Montagnard army trained by U.S. Special Forces rather than South Vietnamese or the U.S. Military Advisory Assistance Group (MAAG). MACV was displeased that the Montagnard showed more loyalty to the U.S. Special Forces than to South Vietnam.

October
3 October
The ARVN killed 59 VC and captured 36 for the loss of two killed in An Xuyên Province.

4 October
The VC ambushed two ARVN companies as they returned from an operation north of Thủ Dầu Một, Bình Dương Province, killing 23 and one U.S. adviser with 14 missing, at least 14 VC were killed.

 5 October
George Ball, Undersecretary of State, wrote a lengthy memo dissenting from the direction of U.S. policy on Vietnam. He said the U.S. should tell South Vietnamese leaders the U.S. will continue support "only if they achieve a unity of purpose ... and create a government free from factionalism and capable of carrying on the affairs of the country." He continued, "We have spent months of concentrated effort trying to devise ways and means to advance the present policy of winning the war ... But we have given almost no attention to the possible political means of finding a way out without further enlargement of the war." The memo was read and responded to by Johnson's top advisers on Vietnam—but apparently was never shown to the President.

Mao Zedong received a delegation of officials from North Vietnam, including its Prime Minister, Phạm Văn Đồng, and predicted that the U.S. effort could be defeated.  Noting that the U.S. had 18 army divisions and that it could only spare three in Asia, Mao concluded that it was "impossible for the United States to send many troops to South Vietnam." Historian Michael Lind would write nearly 50 years later, "The significance of these conversations can hardly be exaggerated.  We now know that the nightmare of American strategists had come true in the summer and fall of 1964."

7 October
The VC shot down a U.S. UH-1B helicopter over Hậu Nghĩa Province killing all six onboard, including five Americans.

Trần Thiện Khiêm left Saigon ostensibly on a goodwill tour but was actually forced into exile for this role in the September coup attempt.

 8 October
In the midst of a Presidential campaign, The New York Times excoriated Republican candidate Barry Goldwater for wanting "to convert an Asian war into an American war" in South Vietnam. Goldwater had accused President Johnson of being indecisive and insufficiently aggressive in combating the spread of communism.

 11 October
The North Vietnamese Central Military Commission ordered the VC and PAVN to jointly "annihilate a part of the enemy's main force units" in South Vietnam between December 1964 and March 1965. Prior to this announcement, PAVN units had not participated in the war in South Vietnam.

14 October
Leonid Brezhnev replaced Nikita Khrushchev as First Secretary of the Communist Party of the Soviet Union, with Alexei Kosygin succeeding him as premier.

 15 October
Nguyễn Văn Trỗi was executed by firing squad in Saigon. A VC guerrilla, he was captured after trying to assassinate Secretary of Defense McNamara and future ambassador Henry Cabot Lodge, Jr. who were visiting South Vietnam, in May 1963. Troi was the first publicly executed VC.

 16 October
China conducted its first successful nuclear weapons test. China's possession of nuclear weapons was seen in both Peking and Hanoi as a deterrent to an American invasion of North Vietnam.

Đức, Phát and 18 others were put on trial in a military court over the September coup attempt. The accused officers claimed to have only intended to make a show of force, rather than overthrow Khánh. Đức claimed that the objective of his actions was to "emphasize my ideas" and said his actions did not constitute a coup attempt and that he had decided to end what he regarded as a military protest demonstration when Khánh promised to consider his concerns. Asked why he had denounced Khánh as a "traitor" in a radio broadcast during the coup attempt, Phát said he had merely "gotten excited". One week later, on 24 October, the charges were dropped. Khánh then gave Đức and Phát two months of detention for indiscipline; their subordinates were incarcerated for shorter periods.

20 October
RVNAF aircraft bombed the village of Anlong Chrey in Cambodia killing seven civilians. Cambodia protested to the United Nations.

 24 October
Ambassador Taylor met with Sửu and expressed his displeasure that the action had been taken without consulting with the United States. Taylor said that, in the future, "We could not accept" a failure of the government to consult with the U.S.

Cambodia shot down a USAF C-123 aircraft that was flying over the Cambodian border village of Dak Dam in the Mondulkiri Province. All eight crew members on board were killed.

25 October
Phan Khắc Sửu was installed as the new President of South Vietnam as part of the military leaders' promise to make the transition to a civilian government.

 27 October
Head of State Sửu appointed Trần Văn Hương as Prime Minister of South Vietnam. Buddhists launched demonstrations against the Hương government. Hương was more resistant to Buddhist demands than the previous Prime Minister, General Khánh, had been. Khánh, however, remained important among the generals.

30 October
After a visit to South Vietnam Leon Gouré of the RAND Corporation reported that U.S. airpower was having a significant impact on the VC and that further unrestrained use could hurt them even more.

November
 1 November

Four Americans and two Vietnamese were killed and 5 B-57s, 3 A-1Hs and 1 HH-43F were destroyed and 13 B-57s, 3 A-1Hs, 3 HH-43s and 2 C-47s were damaged. Ambassador Taylor reported that the VC "had changed the ground rules" by targeting a U.S. installation. He advocated a reprisal, but with the election just two days away Johnson elected not to respond.

Due to deteriorating relations, the U.S. embassy in Phnom Penh orders the evacuation of dependents.

 3 November

President Johnson won a landslide victory over his Republican opponent, Barry Goldwater, in the Presidential election. Johnson was perceived as the more moderate candidate on issues including the use of U.S. military forces in Vietnam.

4 November
Trần Văn Hương was installed as the new Prime Minister of South Vietnam as part of a civilian government selected by the nation's military leaders.

6 November
The RVNAF led by Air Vice Marshal Kỳ launched a 32-aircraft attack against a VC base area in retaliation for the attack on Bien Hoa Air Base, claiming to have killed 500 VC.

7 November
The South Vietnamese Government banned the sale of the latest issue of Newsweek because it contained a photo of the ARVN torturing a VC.

9 November
Typhoon Joan struck South Vietnam and parts of North Vietnam shortly after Typhoon Iris, temporarily halting most combat operations and causing torrential rains and floods that would kill more than 5,000 people. The floods affected 13 provinces in South Vietnam, with most of the dead in the Quảng Ngãi, Quảng Nam and Quảng Tín provinces.

 10 November
Ambassador Maxwell Taylor cabled Washington with his views. Taylor favored the U.S. expanding its participation in the war against the VC and expanding the war to North Vietnam, even if the government of South Vietnam never became competent—advocating the removal of a previous U.S. prerequisite for participation in the war: the existence of a stable and efficient South Vietnamese government.

 14 November
In an attempt to offset the increasing power of the Young Turks, Khánh brought back Don as the deputy chief of staff, and installed fellow Da Lat General Đính as his assistant.

15 November
China shot down the first of hundreds of Ryan Model 147 drone aircraft that the United States would send into Chinese airspace to monitor China's support of North Vietnam during the war. The drone flights would continue for nearly seven years before being suspended in July 1971.

 19 November
A Vietnam working group of mid-level officials from the Departments of State and Defense and the CIA presented its analysis to the senior policymakers of the Johnson Administration. The working group identified three U.S. policy options: Option A was to continue the present policy and reject negotiations with North Vietnam until the situation in South Vietnam improved; Option B was much increased military pressure against North Vietnam until the insurgency in the South was defeated; Option C called for a continuation of present policy but with gradually increased military pressure against the North with no firm position for or against negotiations. Option C was favored by the policymakers.

A South Vietnamese air assault in Quảng Nam Province killed 17 VC and captured 21.

A VC mine derailed a train killing four railway workers.

 20 November
Three regiments (the first full units) of the PAVN to be sent to South Vietnam to assist the VC, departed from North Vietnam to march south along the Ho Chi Minh Trail. Other PAVN troops may have left North Vietnam in October.

22–26 November
Buddhists conduct violent protests against the government which continue until martial law is declared on the 26th.

25 November
William H. Sullivan became U.S. ambassador to Laos.

27–28 November
Ambassador Taylor briefed the National Security Council, recommending increased U.S. bombing of North Vietnam. The Council endorsed Taylor's approach and recommended that Johnson adopt it.

 28 November
U.S. Army Captain Norman W. Heck, in his last letter home before being killed, said that winning the war would be difficult, but that "A fairly effective program of improving the economic and political situation [of South Vietnam] is ... the whole key to success in winning the whole hearted support of the people, and not in the number of Viet Cong killed."

December
1 December
President Johnson and his top-ranking advisers met to discuss plans to bomb North Vietnam. After some debate, they agreed on a two-phase bombing plan with an objective of ending North Vietnamese support of VC operations in South Vietnam and maintaining the security of other non-Communist nations in Southeast Asia. Phase 1 involved bombing infiltration routes through Laos, while Phase 2 would expand the bombing into North Vietnam.

2 December

Two USAF C-47s were modified at Bien Hoa Air Base to mount three GAU-2/A Miniguns. By 15 December both aircraft had been converted into FC-47 gunships and were assigned to the 1st Air Commando Squadron for combat testing.

7-9 December
The PAVN/VC were successful in repeatedly beating back large numbers of counterattacking ARVN troops. This battle was the first time in that area that the PAVN/VC "used the new tactic of coordinating main force units with local and guerrilla forces." The battle resulted in 150 PAVN/VC killed, 300 ARVN casualties and two U.S. killed.

9 December
A VC force attacked and overran an ARVN outpost  from Tam Kỳ. The ARVN, supported by U.S. Marine and Army helicopters, killed 70 VC and captured 39 weapons for the loss of eight ARVN and one U.S. advisor killed.

11 December
An RVNAF C-123B crashed into Monkey Mountain shortly after takeoff from Da Nang Air Base killing all 38 onboard, including two U.S.

 14 December
Operation Barrel Roll began, a covert interdiction and close air support campaign by the U.S. Air Force 2nd Air Division (later the Seventh Air Force) and U.S. Navy Task Force 77, conducted in the Kingdom of Laos. The campaign would continue until 1973.

16 December
The U.S. Embassy in Saigon reported that Prime Minister Huong had successfully repressed Buddhist demonstrations against the government, had imposed censorship and shut down ten newspapers suspected of collaborating with communists.

 19 December
A Cambodian diplomat in Hanoi reported that "Anti-aircraft guns have been positioned on rooftops, and people are busy digging trenches in the streets."  Author Pierre Asselin later said, "Although Americans did not know it at the time, the Vietnam War had begun."

 20 December
Junta leader General Khánh led a group of military officers called the "Young Turks" in a coup. They dissolved the civilian High National Council, arrested a number of military officers and civilian officials, and created an Armed Forces Council. Hương remained as Prime Minister. Ambassador Taylor was outraged by the coup, berating Khánh and the Young Turks who, he said, had acted "without consulting with U.S. representatives and in disregarding our advice on important matters."

 22 December
In an address over military radio, Khánh said, "We make sacrifices for the country's independence and the Vietnamese people's liberty, but not to carry out the policy of any foreign country." He said it was "better to live poor but proud as free citizens of an independent country rather than in ease and shame as slaves of the foreigners and Communists." Khánh pledged support for both Hương and Suu's civilian rule, and condemned colonialism in a thinly veiled reference to the US.

 23 December
In an exclusive interview with Beverly Deepe published in the New York Herald Tribune on December 23, Khánh said "if Taylor did not act more intelligently, Southeast Asia would be lost" and added that Taylor's "attitude during the last 48 hours—as far as my small head is concerned—has been beyond imagination". Justifying the removal of the HNC, Khánh said they were "exploited by counter-revolutionary elements who placed partisan considerations above the homeland's sacred interest."

In the evening, Khánh convinced his fellow officers to join him in lobbying Hương to declare Taylor persona non grata and expel him from South Vietnam. However, someone in the junta was a CIA informant and reported the incident, allowing American officials to individually lobby the officers to change their stance. At the same time, the Americans informed Hương if Taylor was expelled, US funding would stop. The next day, the generals changed their mind and when they met Hương at his office, only asked him to formally denounce Taylor's behavior in his meetings with Khánh and his quartet and to "take appropriate measures to preserve the honor of all the Vietnamese armed forces and to keep national prestige intact".

 24 December
On December 24, Khánh issued a declaration of independence from "foreign manipulation", and condemned "colonialism", explicitly accusing Taylor of abusing his power. In response to the strained relations, General Westmoreland  requested CINCPAC to place a Marine Landing Force off Vũng Tàu, at the mouth of the Saigon River around 80 km southeast of the capital. Westmoreland also put American marines based at Subic Bay in the Philippines on notice.

Bob Hope made his first Christmas visit to South Vietnam, and he and his 60-member troupe entertained 1,200 servicemen at Bien Hoa Air Base. He opened by joking, "Hello, advisers. Here I am in Bien Hoa ... which is Vietnamese for 'Duck!!'". Referring to his surroundings as "Sniper Valley", he said, "As I flew in today, they gave us a 21-gun salute ... Three of them were ours."

The Brinks Hotel in Saigon was bombed by the VC. Two VC operatives detonated a car bomb underneath the hotel, which was a Bachelor Officer Quarters for U.S. Army officers; the explosion killed two American officers and injured approximately 60, including military personnel and Vietnamese civilians. The attack just missed the arrival of Bob Hope's entourage. So unsettled was the situation in South Vietnam that the U.S. could not immediately determine whether the attack was by the VC or by disenchanted South Vietnamese officials.

 25 December
Angry with Deepe for airing Khánh's grievances, Taylor excluded her from a private briefing to the other US journalists. However, someone informed Deepe of what Taylor had said, and she published the remarks on December 25 under the title "Taylor Rips Mask Off Khánh". In this article, Taylor was quoted as describing some South Vietnamese officers as borderline "nuts" and accusing many generals of staying in Saigon and allowing their junior officers to run the war as they saw fit. Deepe's article caused an uproar due to the tension between Taylor and the Vietnamese generals.

 28 December – 2 January 1965
In the Battle of Binh Gia, a Catholic village not far from Saigon was attacked by the VC. Before retiring, the VC killed 201 ARVN soldiers and five American advisers, VC losses were at least 32 killed. Binh Ghia was the largest battle to date between the ARVN and the VC.

 29 December
The Guardian echoed a large number of media outlets worldwide, saying, "Perhaps the least damaging decision for America ... would be a withdrawal (from South Vietnam) based on a clear and detailed statement explaining the impossibility of assisting a sovereign country to defend itself when it refuses to concentrate its own efforts or its own defense, or to abandon its internal factional struggles."

 30 December
President Johnson cabled Ambassador Taylor in Saigon, criticizing Taylor for his inability to communicate "sensitively and persuasively" with the South Vietnamese during the ongoing political crisis there.  Turning to the military situation, Johnson said, "Every time I get a military recommendation it seems to me that it calls for large-scale bombing. I have never felt that this war will be won from the air, and it seems to me that what is much more needed and would be more effective is a larger and stronger use of Rangers and Special Forces and Marines, or other appropriate military strength on the ground."  Johnson said, "I myself am ready to substantially increase the number of Americans fighting in Vietnam."

Johnson rejected the calls from Westmoreland and Taylor among others to authorize reprisal bombings against North Vietnam, citing political instability in Saigon. He reasoned that outside opinion was unlikely to believe the Viet Cong were behind the attack, feeling they would instead blame local infighting for the violence and conclude that the Americans were "trying to shoot its way out of an internal [South Vietnamese] political crisis".

 31 December
Two hundred and sixteen American soldiers were killed in the war in 1964. 23,310 U.S. military personnel were in South Vietnam at the end of the year. The South Vietnamese armed forces suffered 7,457 killed in action, about 30 percent more than the total killed in the previous year.

Over the course of the year, in South Vietnam the VC and PAVN main-force soldiers increased from an estimated 23,000 to 33,000, while the total number of both regular and guerrilla armed communist personnel was about 100,000. They were better armed, especially with Chinese-made AK-47s, and more aggressive. Casualties inflicted on South Vietnam's armed forces increased from 1,900 in January to 3,000 in December. An estimated 12,400 soldiers from North Vietnam were infiltrated into South Vietnam during the year.

Year in numbers

References

Sources

 Foreign Relations of the United States, 1964–1968, Volume I, Vietnam, 1964''.  U.S. Department of State.
 

Vietnam War by year
War
Vietnam
United States history timelines